William Francis May (born 25 October 1927) is an American ethicist.

May was born in Chicago and later moved to Houston, where he graduated from high school, aged sixteen. He was accepted at the Princeton School of Public and International Affairs, and sought to pursue a career in law and politics. After the death of his high school debate coach, May became interested in philosophy. At the age of 20, May spent a year in Oklahoma as an interim pastor, then enrolled at Yale Divinity School. He earned a degree in divinity in 1952, started his teaching career in theology at Smith College, and simultaneously pursued a doctorate in contemporary theology at Yale, which he obtained in 1962. Four years after completing his doctorate, May joined the Indiana University as chair of ethics. While teaching at Indiana, he received a Guggenheim Fellowship in 1978. In 1985, May began teaching at Southern Methodist University as Cary M. Maguire University Professor of Ethics. He held the professorship until 2001. During his tenure at SMU, May also served as the inaugural director of the Cary M. Maguire Center for Ethics and Public Responsibility from 1995 to 1998. In 2017, the directorship of the Maguire Center for Ethics was endowed in May's name. May is a founding fellow of The Hastings Center and served on the President's Council on Bioethics from 2002 to 2004. In September 2007, James H. Billington named May the Cary and Ann Maguire Chair in American History and Ethics at the John W. Kluge Center. May retained the position for three months.

Publications

References

Writers from Houston
Writers from Chicago
Yale Divinity School alumni
Princeton University alumni
20th-century American male writers
1927 births
Living people
American ethicists
Southern Methodist University faculty
Indiana University faculty
Smith College faculty
21st-century American male writers
Hastings Center Fellows
Medical ethicists